Husinec is a town in Prachatice District in the South Bohemian Region of the Czech Republic. It has about 1,400 inhabitants. It is known as the birthplace of one of the main figures in Czech history, Jan Hus. The town centre is well preserved and is protected by law as an urban monument zone.

Administrative parts
Villages of Horouty and Výrov are administrative parts of Husinec.

Geography
It lies in the Bohemian Forest Foothills.

The Blanice River flows through the town. South of the town proper is the Husinec Reservoir, built on the Blanice. It was built in 1935–1939 for flood protection.

History

Acooring to chroniclers, in 942, Duke Boleslaus I sent all the people to the local landscape who did not want to accept the Christian faith to pan for gold, from which the duke insisted tithe. The first written mention of Husinec is from 1291 when Heinrich Vok of Borek and Husinec declared his rights to the area at the District Court. In 1359, the village was promoted to a town.

In the 14th century, the Hus castle in the area of today's Záblatí was built and Husinec was attached to his newly established estate. In 1390, the Hus Castle and the manor was taken by Sigismund of Huller and Orlík, a supporter of King Wenceslaus IV and eventually state treasurer and King's advisor. Caught falsifying documents, however, he was beheaded. The castle was left for his brother Andreas. A short time later he sold it to Knight Mikuláš of Hus, who died in 1420.

The abandoned castle was taken and plundered by the robber baron Habart from Hrádek, or Lopata from Budějovice, known as "The merchant of the Golden Trail". On 8 September 1441, landowners from surrounding towns joined together to attack and burn the castle. In 1455, Knight Smílek of Lnáře sold his allegiance to Ulrich II of Rosenberg bringing Husinec under the rule of Vimperk.

The economy of Husinec was dependent up the trade produced by the Golden Trail trade route. Goods transported on the route included, primarily, salt, expensive clothes, wine, seafood, tropical fruits, spices, iron and weapons.

In 1601, Peter Vok of Rosenberg sold Husinec to the Kolowrat family. In 1630, the manor was acquired by Hans Ulrich von Eggenberg. After the Battle of White Mountain, many residents of Husinec who were followers of the reformer Jan Hus and his teachings, emigrated abroad.

From 1655 to 1848 Husinec fell under the control of the House of Schwarzenberg. In 2007, Husinec was restored its status of a town.

Demographics

Sights

The birthplace of Jan Hus is a national cultural monument. The originally Gothic house has been open to the public since 1873. There is also the statue of Jan Hus on the square.

Church of the Exaltation of the Holy Cross is a parish church from 1804. It was built after the original Gothic church was burned down in 1802.

Church of Saints Cyril and Methodius is a neo-Romanesque cemetery church. It was built in 1870.

Notable people
Jan Hus (c.1372–1415), theologian, philosopher and reformer
Johann Pehel (1852–1926), composer

References

External links

Cities and towns in the Czech Republic
Populated places in Prachatice District
Prácheňsko